Dobrotin may refer to:
 Dobrotin (Bajina Bašta), a village in Bajina Bašta, Serbia
 Dobrotin (Leskovac), a village in Leskovac, Serbia